Aroha Bridge is a New Zealand adult animated comedy by Jessica Hansell. The series focuses on the biracial twins Kōwhai and Monty Hook as they navigate the fictional community of Aroha Bridge and their pursuit in finding stardom. Aroha Bridge began as a webcomic entitled Hook Ups, which was first published in Volume magazine in 2011. It was later renamed and made into a series of 3 minute online shorts that first aired on The New Zealand Herald website. Aroha Bridge was later greenlit as a full series with funding from NZ On Air and aired on Māori Television. The animated series first aired on 23 May 2013, and stars Jessica Hansell, Rizván Tu’Itahi, Madeleine Sami, Frankie Stevens, and Scotty Cotter.

Synopsis
Aroha Bridge focuses on the fictional community of Aroha Bridge and the multicultural community within it, with a focus on "authentic, urban Māori characters". The series focuses on the biracial twins Kōwhai and Monty Hook as they try to navigate the complex relations of their whānau and hometown all while the two try and achieve stardom.

Characters

Main
Jessica Hansell as Kōwhai Hook, the motivated but also mildly delusional twin sister of Monty, of whom she forms half of the band "Hook Ups" with.
Rizván Tu'itahi as Monty Hook, the laid-back and talented twin brother of Kōwhai, of whom forms half of the band "Hook Ups" with.
Madeleine Sami as Mum Hook, the mother of Kōwhai and Monty and described as being "pakeha on the outside, wannabe Māori on the inside". She is passionate about Te Reo, but is not fluent in the language, reflective of other amateurs in New Zealand.
Frankie Stevens as Manu Hook, the father of Kōwhai and Monty, described as the reverse of Mum Hook, in that he is Māori on the outside and wannabe Pākeha on the inside, suppressing his internalized racism. Manu is a former military member and enjoys rugby, he additionally cannot stand his brother Noogy.
Scotty Cotter as Ira Hook, the twins' eccentric cousin who serves as their band's number one fan and as comic encouragement towards the twins' shenanigans.

Recurring
Madeleine Sami as Angeline Hook, the twins' 10-year old cousin who is a successful international pop star. She serves as Kōwhai's nemesis.
Madeleine Sami as Aunty Winny, the twins' sporty aunt.
Oscar Kightley as Mayor TokoUso, the Samoan/Tongan mayor of Aroha Bridge and described as having a model minority complex.
Julian Dennison as Tapi, a street hustler who deals in dubious goods.
Matai Smith as Uncle Noogy, the twins' activist uncle and Polynesian Panther who exclusively speaks in the Māori language.
Rachel House as Whaea Bubbles, the twins' grandmother. Hansell described as a "a Frankenstein of everybody’s whaea".

Production
Aroha Bridge was originally entitled Hook Ups, and began as a webcomic by Jessica Hansell, also known as Coco Solid, which was first published in 2011 by the music magazine Volume. Hansell was asked to create a comic by the editor of Volume, Sam Wicks. It was then developed into a ten-part short web animation, which debuted on The New Zealand Herald website. Before being fully greenlit as an animated series with support by NZ On Air's Brenda Leeuwenberg, with the show airing on Māori Television.

The series had been renamed following concerns by fans who would google up the original title and would instead find pornography under the same title. The title was chosen "because it's a big part of the show, in terms of geography, their suburb, their whanau" according to Hansell. The inclusion of words in the Māori language in a naturalistic format was part of the ethos of the show, Hansell stated that the show's team wanted to make Māoridom a "natural, braided thing". In addition, the new name of the show was a reference to Māngere Bridge, where Hansell had grown up. The show's location is inspired by Māngere Bridge during the 1980s and 1990s, but additionally has "DNA from Porirua and Newtown and the Waikato." The was described by Hansell as a "Frankenstein beast of all of my friends, family, and me – showing that everyone is connected whether we like it or not", and that the characters were all a tiny part of her.

Themes
Aroha Bridge addresses and amplifies contemporary social issues facing Pacific Islanders and Pacific culture. Alex Behan, writing in Stuff, commented that the show offers a "layered world addressing Aotearoa's cultural issues with a mix of insight, outrage and comedy". The first episode of the second season discusses themes of generational resentment, cultural appropriation, and hypocrisy in politics. The first episode of the third season touches on the Hollywood perception of the Pacific and the exploitation of Pacific culture for financial gain. The second episode of the third season discusses the systemic barriers that Māori face in the education system in attaining proper education and scholarships. In the fourth episode of the third season, the episode discusses the issue of loan sharking in low-income areas. The third season often addresses the right to protest, reflecting the events at Ihumātao that were happening as the season aired.

The portrayal of the series' characters is intended to spark a nuanced conversation on the social factors leading to their characterization, including Manu's internalized racism and Uncle Noogy's radical activism. The series' humor was described by Hansell as being rooted in multiculturalism. The portrayal of the characters in Aroha Bridge is meant to dispel stereotypes and dispel previous instances of superficial and reductive treatment of Māori and Pasifika with regards to their representations in media. The development for the individual characters which series showcases was described as "mad developed" by Leonie Hayden in The Spinoff.

The series' four Māori writers are credited for the series' nuanced approach towards contemporary issues facing the Māori community, with their lived experienced and "cultural truth" being reflected in the series. Hansell cited her frustration with the "same archetypes tumble drying all the time", getting into storytelling to prioritize Māori and Pacific stories. Hansell describes the show's mixture of animation and comedy masking a deeper subtext that would come out to viewers as they watch the show, stressing that there needs to be recognition in New Zealand for the "counter-cultural freedom" that adult animation overseas is recognized for. Comedy, as Hansell describes, is a way for her to cope with the politics and dysfunction that she sees in her daily life.

Episodes

Season 1 (2013)

Season 2 (2016)

Season 3 (2019)

Reception
Alex Behan writing for Stuff described Aroha Bridge as a "cultural minefield of sorts", stating that the show "manages to walk the delicate tightrope that only brilliantly pitched satire can". Behan praised the portrayal of some of the series' characters for how they take "painful ugly realities and [mine] them for laughs", and the thought that was put into the show's production would "cement Jessica Hansell as one of Aotearoa's most important voices".

Miriama Aoake writing in Pantograph Punch described her familiarity with the characters that the show had portrayed. Stating there had "never been a TV show that can both reflect and deny those buzzy idiosyncrasies in a whānau dynamic", describing it as both "disarming and affirming". Aoake praised the marriage of humor and animation to deliver a sensation that "hits like a delayed concussion".

Rachel Montpelier writing in Women and Hollywood stated that the show's interesting and multifaceted presentation surpassed a comparison with combination of the family dynamics in Transparent, the world building found in Orange Is the New Black, and Key & Peele dissection on the expressions of race. Describing Aroha Bridge as "rare series that has a defined point-of-view, a balance of specific and universal humor".

Accolades
Aroha Bridge has been featured in several film festivals including the SBS Short Film Festival, ImagineNATIVE Film and Media Arts Festival, and the Mother Tongue Film Festival. In 2019, the series won "Best Web Series" in a field of 15 during the 2019 Los Angeles Film Awards. The show was nominated during the 2020 NZ TV awards for the category of "Best Comedy/Comedy Entertainment Program", but lost to Wellington Paranormal.

References

2010s adult animated television series
New Zealand adult animated comedy television series
Television shows funded by NZ on Air
2013 in New Zealand television
English-language television shows
Animated television series about twins
Animated television series about dysfunctional families
Animated television series about families